Esmée Denters (born 28 September 1988) is a Dutch singer and YouTube celebrity. Denters started promoting herself as a musician online in 2006, covering songs by artists including Justin Timberlake and Natasha Bedingfield. By mid-2008 she became one of the first music artists to exceed 100 million views on YouTube.  Denters was signed by Timberlake as the first artist to his label Tennman Records. In May 2009, she released her debut studio album, Outta Here, and toured the United States with Timberlake. After the label dropped her, Denters moved to London, where she competed in BBC One's The Voice UK.

In 2017, Denters released her EP These Days, followed by the EP Past, Present, Future in 2020.

Early life
Denters was born in Arnhem, Gelderland, The Netherlands.  Denters lived in Westervoort next to Arnhem until she was fifteen, when her family moved to Oosterbeek, Gelderland. She graduated from high school in Arnhem in 2006 and subsequently attended the HAN University of Applied Sciences where she was working towards a Bachelor of Social Work until she dropped out in her first year in February 2007 to join Tennman Records.

Career

2006–2008: Early career
On 25 August 2006, Denters made a YouTube channel. She posted several videos of herself singing covers of other pop stars' songs. Denters traveled to the U.S. to write songs and record in the studio. There were plans for a reality show around Denters in the United States, which followed up the release of her debut album. She also sang a song that was written by Kelly Rowland of Destiny's Child. She then flew to Sweden for a few days to write songs and record.

In 2008, Denters started her professional career after attracting the attention of Dutch media scouts and American pop singer Justin Timberlake. Timberlake went on to sign her as the first artist to his label Tennman Records. Timberlake served as an executive producer on her debut album, Outta Here.

She also appeared on TV shows like Oprah.

2009–2010:Outta Here and collaborations

In April 2009, Denters confirmed on Dutch radio station Radio 538 that her debut album would be released in the Netherlands on 22 May 2009, also confirming that the album is a mix of Pop and R&B with both ballads, and uptempo tracks. Her debut single, also the title song of the album, was released in the Netherlands on 14 April 2009 and in the UK on 15 August. Outta Here reached number five in the Netherlands and charted in Belgium, where it reached number 3 for five weeks on the Flemish Region Albums Chart. The album was released in the UK on 11 January 2010 and features her 2008 charity duet with Timberlake, "Follow My Lead" as an additional bonus song. The second single, "Admit It", only reached 28 in the Netherlands and 56 in the UK.

In autumn 2009, Denters went on tour with Honor Society. The album's third single "Love Dealer" reached 12 and 68 in the Netherlands and UK respectively.

Denters also worked on several collaborations during this time. She performed on tour with artists Ne-Yo, Enrique Iglesias and N-Dubz. She lent her vocals to the German band Stanfour who featured Denters on their single "Life Without You", released on 25 May 2010. The music video for the single was postponed due to the April 2010 Icelandic volcano eruption. On 1 May, Denters and Stanfour flew to New York to record the video for "Life Without You". The official release of "Life Without You" in Germany was 28 May. The video leaked on the internet on 24 May. In the UK, she also accepted a collaboration with British rapper Chipmunk on his hit "Until You Were Gone", which entered the top three on UK charts.

She received an MTV Europe Music Award in 2009 and the European Border Breakers Award in 2010 for Outta Love.

2011–2014: Dismissal from Tennman Records

Denters started working on new songs for her second studio album in January 2011. She worked with British DJ and producer K-Gee and musician Ben Cullum on the album, which was to be titled Screaming Out Loud. "City Lights" was the first single from the album.

At the end of 2012, Dutch DJ and producer Erik Arbores and Denters collaborated for the new Dance4Life theme song called "dance4life (now dance)", released digitally on 23 November. They performed the song at the Dance4Life 2012 charity event in Ahoy, Rotterdam. Denters was dropped from Tennman Records that year.

On 24 February 2014, Denters returned to the stage, performing new music at Showcase Live in London. She opened the show singing her first hit single "Outta Here" followed by three new original songs: "Cars and Airplanes", "If I Could I Would" and "Anything For The Money", along with a performance of Lorde's "Royals", Drake's "Hold On, We're Going Home", and Avicii's "Wake Me Up".

On 24 September 2014, Denters released her first independent single "If I Could I Would" on iTunes and Spotify.

2015–present: The Voice UK and independent work
On 24 January 2015, Denters appeared on BBC One's The Voice UK, selected to join will.i.am's team for the next round. However, she was eliminated at the knockout stage.

At the end of 2017, Denters worked with Shaun Reynolds and released a 5-song EP These Days on iTunes and Spotify. In January 2018, Denters mentioned on Instagram that the second part of the EP would be released in May 2018. On 25 May 2018, Denters sang the lead single "Feeling Good" live on the Dutch TV show M. One month later Denters headlined her own live show at the Melkweg in The Netherlands. Sylvia Aimee and MVTCHES were the opening acts. A second live show followed in March 2019 at The Borderline in London.

In 2020, Denters released a 3-song EP titled Past, Present, Future. The EP was created during the UK lockdown with Shaun Reynolds, who said they "managed to piece [it] together remotely from two opposite sides of the capital." The EP includes the tracks "Love Me The Same", "Ruins", and "Better Things", with each song depicting a different period of time in a romantic relationship.

Media

Appearances in the Dutch and international media.

YouTube

The uploaded Youtube-video's from Esmee Denters can be found below. A video appears on the list if it is a song, it reached more than 100,000 views on YouTube, is not an official released single, not part of a TV show and cannot be found on an album.

Discography

Tours

2007
Justin Timberlake – FutureSex/LoveShow (opening act, Europe)

2009
Enrique Iglesias – Greatest Hits tour (opening act, Europe)
Ne-Yo – Year of the Gentleman tour (opening act, Europe)
Honor Society – Fashionably Late tour (opening act, United States/Canada)
N-Dubz Christmas Party (opening act, UK)

2010
Stanfour – Rise & Fall tour (special guest, Germany)

Awards

Notes and references

External links

 Esmée Denters Artist Discography 
 Esmée Denters Esmée Denters 

1988 births
Living people
People from Arnhem
Dutch dance musicians
Dutch singer-songwriters
 
English-language singers from the Netherlands
21st-century Dutch singers
Dutch YouTubers
21st-century Dutch women singers
MTV Europe Music Award winners
Music YouTubers
YouTube vloggers